Graham Hogg (2 March 1948 - 8 August 2017) was a Scotland international rugby union player and rugby union coach.

Rugby Union career

Amateur career

A product of Hawick High School, Hogg played for Hawick Wanderers and Hawick Linden before moving to play for Hawick.

Hogg moved to Edinburgh University to study; and he then played for Boroughmuir.

In 1976, he was part of the Boroughmuir side that won the Melrose Sevens.

Provincial career

He played for Edinburgh District.

International career

His was capped twice by Scotland in 1978.

Coaching career

He coached Borughmuir and then Edinburgh District. He then moved on to coach the combined Scottish Districts side and the Scotland Students side and then Scotland 'A'. He coached Scotland 'A' to the 1998 Grand Slam.

He then moved to coach Currie. He coached Currie to win the Scottish Premiership in 2006-07 and in 2009-10 seasons. Hogg had arrived at the club when they were in Division 4.

Administrative career

For a short while he was a Director of Currie.

He later became Chairman of the club.

Civil Service career

He worked with the Inland Revenue with HMRC.

References

1948 births
2017 deaths
Scottish rugby union players
Scotland international rugby union players
Rugby union players from Hawick
Hawick RFC players
Edinburgh District (rugby union) players
Hawick Linden RFC players
Hawick Wanderers RFC players
Boroughmuir RFC players
Rugby union wings